Communist Party of Galicia (Revolutionary Marxist) (in Galician:  Partido Comunista de Galicia (Marxista-Revolucionario), PCG-MR) was a communist political party in Galiza, founded by the followers of Santiago Carrillo after their expulsion from the Communist Party of Galicia (PCG) in October 1985.

History
PCG-MR participated in the 1985 Galician elections, gaining 8,318 votes (0.66%) and failing to win any seat. In the municipal elections of 1987, PCG-MR had 8 town councillors elected. In the general elections of 1986, the party gained 12,072 votes and, again, no seats.

Following the bad result of the 1989 general elections, PCG-MR merged into the Spanish Socialist Workers' Party in 1991, and organized itself as an internal tendency called Left Unity (Unidade da Esquerda).

Election results

References

1985 establishments in Spain
Defunct communist parties in Spain
Defunct socialist parties in Galicia (Spain)
Political parties disestablished in 1989
Political parties established in 1985